A Stab in the Dark is a whodunnit written by Australian playwright Alex Vickery-Howe. The first production was performed in Adelaide, South Australia, in February - March 2008 and directed by Toni Main.

Original Cast 

Helmut Kinderland 	   James Aubrey

Randal Devlin Scout	   Adam Willson

Myles Fletcher    	   Andrew Crupi

Eleanor Grubb    		   Bridget Walters

Isabella Virtue   	   Tanya Kaploon

Jade Sloan     		   Katherine Warner

Walter Crowley  		   Martin Hissey

Lacey Crowley   		   Maya Aleksandra

Sheila Hunt     		   Stephanie Pinnock

Maverick Horne  		   Alec Hall

Synopsis  

A Stab in the Dark begins with the arrival of Myles Fletcher and Randal Devlin Scout to the remote island home of their adopted father, Helmut Kinderland. Sniveling, stuttering Fletcher is a stark contrast to the confident and charismatic Scout. The two swap stories about the times shared together in Mr. Kinderland's custody before they are joined by Eleanor Grubb, the caretaker.
Fletcher agonizes over the dire weather warnings as Scout gets the alcohol flowing and Mrs. Grubb wonders who these two strange people are, despite having been their nanny for many years. The reunion party moves up a notch when Isabella Virtue, Fletcher's old flame, swans in. Fletcher and Virtue have shared a steamy past causing Fletcher to become even more nervous. Soon, Walter Crowley and his butch wife Sheila Hunt thunder through the door mid-argument.

The Crowleys are followed by Walter's twin sister, Lacey. She attempts to steer the reunion back on course while Jade Sloan, a twisted and sadistic fashion designer, enters to expose the bitter secrets of the feuding guests. Finally, the last member of the group, dashing pilot Maverick Horne, enters via the back window and tries to seduce everyone else in the room. The cast of wicked characters is assembled and, just when everyone begins to put their differences aside, Mr. Kinderland's bloody corpse slips out from behind the curtains...

Development 

The play was developed at Higher Ground, a South Australian arts venue, as part of the 2008 Adelaide Fringe. The writer received the Independent Arts Foundation Literature Award based on a body of work, including A Stab in the Dark and Once Upon a Midnight.

Genre 
The show is a murder mystery homage, closely modeled on Agatha Christie's 1939 novel And Then There Were None but in the fast-paced comic style of Clue and Murder By Death. There are elements of slapstick and wordplay but also scenes that feature graphic horror and surrealism.

Throughout, the killer mimics Poe's The Masque of the Red Death, alluding to the strand that binds the adopted children together... in this case, the 'pestilence' Red Death refers to is porphyria. Each of the characters possesses a rare blood type and they eventually discover that they were all adopted to keep their "father", Helmut Kinderland, healthy through regular transfusions. It is suggested that Mr. Kinderland murdered their birth parents to harvest them as babies, triggering the chain of events.

A further allusion is made to the seven deadly sins; sloth (Helmut Kinderland), gluttony (Walter Crowley), pride (Jade Sloan), envy (Sheila Hunt), lust (Maverick Horne), greed (Randal Devlin Scout) and the killer's wrath. In contrast, aptly named Isabella Virtue is loyal to Myles Fletcher, who embodies humility, while Lacey Crowley is defined by her kindness. The latter three survive until the play's climax.

In the climactic scene, the play breaks completely from naturalism by having the character of Mr. Kinderland return from the dead, as a ghost or vision, but this is framed as a symptom of the killer's madness. Additionally, the song Hush, Little Baby is repeated many times in the story, often when the characters are reflecting on their childhood, to create an eerie effect. At first, there is an onstage source for the song, but over time, it creeps in without explanation and plays for the last time when the killer is confronted.

Critical reception 
Rip It Up Magazine said of the original production  "A Stab In The Dark brings together a cast of characters representing all aspects of human vice, and everyone quickly exhibits all sorts of ulterior motives as the plot takes all sorts of twists and turns. Played brilliantly by all the players and with some great artistic direction, this one will keep you guessing right till the thrilling conclusion. Remember, nothing is as it seems! Very good indeed!"

Michigan Performance 
The play was performed in Delton, Michigan in February 2016 and directed by Renae Feldpausch.

American Cast 

Helmut Kinderland 	   Gene Trantham

Randal Devlin Scout	   Sam West

Myles Fletcher    	   Charlie Saulino

Eleanor Grubb    		   Sharon Weisman

Isabella Virtue   	   Jordan Dimock

Jade Sloan     		   Sarah Eddy

Walter Crowley  		   Franklin White

Lacey Crowley   		   Karla Fales

Sheila Hunt     		   Adorée Miron

Maverick Horne  		   Will Eichelberger

Additionally, Rodger Hough played a policeman in the final scene.

References

External links 
 Article from: The Advertiser
 Article From: AusStage: Gateway to performing Arts (Official Australian Theatre Database)

2008 plays
Mystery fiction
Australian plays
Thriller plays
Islands in fiction
Seven deadly sins in popular culture